Karad is a city in Satara district of Indian state of Maharashtra and it is 320 km (180.19 miles) from Mumbai, 72 km From Sangli and 159 km from Pune.  It lies at the confluence of Koyna River and the Krishna River known as the "Priti sangam". The two rivers originate at Mahabaleshwar (famous hill station in Satara- Maharashtra), which is around 100 km from Karad. They diverge at their origin, and travel for about the same distance to meet again in Karad.  The rivers meet exactly head on, thus forming letter "T" which is the only head on confluence in the world. Hence Krishna and Koyna river's confluence is called Preeti Sangam, meaning Confluence of Love. Karad is well known for sugar production and is known as the sugar bowl of Maharashtra owing to the presence of many sugar factories in and around Karad. It is considered as an important educational hub in Western Maharashtra due to the presence of many prestigious educational institutes. This place is also known for resting place or (Samadhi) of the first chief minister of Maharashtra Shri. Yashwantrao Chavan situated at the confluence of Krishna and Koyana river.

Karad has an adjoining small town named Malkapur, Karad which has its own municipal council and a population of 86,671. Karad city was awarded a prize under "Sant Gadagebaba Gramswachhata Abhiyan" started by Indian Government.

The pin code of Karad is 415 110, Karad have independent Regional Transport officer ( R.T.O), Karad, Satara Rural.

The RTO code for Karad RTO is MH50.

History

It was originally known as "Karhatak", meaning "Elephant Market". Karad is also a city of historical importance. According to Mahabharata, Sahadeva one of the Pandavas lived in the city also known to be pious as Lord Rama stepped his feet on this land. Located to the south west of Karad is Karad Caves, also known as Aghashiv Caves.

The first capital of the Shilaharas was probably at Karad during the reign of Jatiga-II as known from their copper plate grant of Miraj and Vikramankadevacharita of Bilhana. Hence sometimes they are referred as 'Shilaharas of Karad'. The capital was later shifted to Kolhapur. Among the Silaharas of Kolhapur who ruled over Satara and Belganv districts from 1000 to 1215 A. D., Gonka deserves mention here, as he is described as the Lord of Karhad (Karad), Mairifvja (Miraj) and Konkan.

Features

Major landmarks in the city include Kolhapur Naka, MSRTC Bus Stand, Krishna Naka, Karve Naka, Jama Masjid, Chawdi Chowk, Krishna Ghat, Historical Manora, Bhaji Mandai, Bheda Hospital Chowk, Town Hall, Chhatrapati Shivaji Stadium, Krishna Canal Chowk, Vidyanagar, Yashwant Highschool, Cottage (Venutai Chavan) Hospital, Dutta Chowk, S.M's English medium school, Kanya Shala, Tilak Highschool and Holy Family Convent School in Vidyanagar among others. 
 
Karad is a pleasant city to live in. People are cooperative and the place is safe for living. Amenities are all good and almost like any other Tier-2 cities but this city is yet to open its doors for night life. Karad is also an marketplace enabling people to trade their farmed produce in local market.

Geography

It has an average elevation of 566 metres (1857
 feet). Karad is located near Agashiva caves . It has been referred in great epic Mahabharata. It has the shape of an "Aum" (Devanagari) when viewed aerially.

Nearest Cities and Tourism
 Satara: 51km

 Palus : 38km 

 Uran Islampur : 34km

Some famous tourist places in and around Karad are:
Preeti Sangam (Krishna-Koyna Confluence) ➤  2 km 
 Krishnamai Temple ➤  2 km
 Pritisangam Udyan ➤  2 km 
 Late Yashwantrao Chavan's Samadhi ➤  2 km 
 Historical Monument 'Manore' (2 Minars) ➤  2 km
 Naktya Ravlyachi Vihir (Ancient Well) ➤  2 km 
 Masjid Built by Sultan Ali Adilshah (1557- 1580) ➤  2 km
 Sadashivgad ➤  5 km
 Khodshi Dam  ➤  5 km
 Agashiv Caves ➤  5 km 
 Vasantgad ➤  15 km
 Talbid (Ram Mandir) ➤  15 km
 Sar-Senapati Hambirrao Mohite Samadhi ➤ 15 km
 Chauranginath Temple, Sonsal ➤  20 km
 Ramling Bet, Bahe ➤ 30 km 
 Shri Khandoba Devsthan, Pal ➤  30 km 
 Ram Mandir Chaphal ➤  30 km
 Yamai Mandir, Aundh  ➤  35 km
 Uttarmand Dam ➤  35 km 
 Sagareshwar Wildlife Sanctuary Palus ➤  30 km
 Valmiki Temple ➤ 45 km
 Chandoli National Park shirala  49 km
 Chandoli Dam shirala ➤  50 km
Koyna Dam ➤  60 km
 Nawja Waterfall ➤  65 km

Some famous points near Satara : ( Km From Karad )

 Ganesh Temple, Angapur ➤  40 km
 Tuljabhavani Temple, Shendre ➤  45 km
 Charbhinti ➤  60 km
Ajinkyatara ➤ 60 km
 Yavateshvar ➤  60 km
Sajjangad ➤  65 km
 Ganesh Temple, Phutka Talav ➤  65 km
 Sangam Mahuli ➤  60 km
 Chalkewadi Wind Mills ➤ 75 km
 Pateshwar ➤  75 km
Kaas Plateau ➤  75 km
Thoseghar Waterfall ➤ 75 km
 Vajrai Waterfall ➤  85 km
 Baramoteyachi Vihir ➤  85 km

Cityscape
The city has many important government offices and other institutions of significance. With the vision of great leader P.D. Patil the city was one of the few in India to have a well- planned underground drainage system well before in the 1960s. By end-2010, Malkapur, Karad, on the outskirts of the city of Karad, is delivering water 24x7 to all its residents as a result of concrete steps taken by the Malkapur Nagar Panchayat (MNP) with support from the Maharashtra Jeevan Pradhikaran (MJP), a state government entity. This is the first of its kind by a public body in India. Major offices and institutions in Karad are as follows:

 Karad Court, Karad
 Diwani -Foujdari Court, Karad
 Doordarshan Kendra, Karad
 Fire- Brigade, Karad
 Division Office, Karad 
 Tehsil Office, Karad
 Khashaba Chounk 
 Panchayat Samiti, Karad
 Government Rest House, Karad
 City Police Station, Karad
 Taluka Police Station, Karad
 Head Post Office, Karad
 Railway Station, Karad
 Airport, Karad
 MSRTC Depot, Karad
 Cottage Hospital, Karad
 RTO Office, Karad
 Taswade MIDC, Karad
 Nagarpalika, Karad 
 Town Hall, Karad

Demographics

 India census, Karad town and surrounding villages had total population of 74,355. Males constitute 52% of the population and females 48%. Karad has an average literacy rate of 76%, higher than the national average of 59.5%: male literacy is 80%, and female literacy is 72%. In Karad, 11% of the population is under 6 years of age. Vast majority of people belong to Hinduism and Speak Marathi language.

Transportation

National Highways
The National Highway 48 (formerly National Highway 4) goes through the Karad city. National Highway 48 (NH 48) is a major National Highway in Western and Southern India. NH 48 links four of the 10 most populous Indian cities - Mumbai, Bengaluru, Chennai and Pune. NH 48 also connects Karad to Uran Islampur,  Kolhapur. Pune is the largest metropolis near Karad and Kolhapur, Sangli is an important trade centre and Karad is educational hub for IIT training and a tourist destination.

Airport

An Airstrip was constructed in the 1955 by the Public Works Department to facilitate the Koyna dam project. It is currently being used for General aviation and pilot training. The airport is spread on 65 acres and the acquisition of more than 100 acres has been proposed. Runway 10/28 is 1280 meters long and 30 meters wide with a 60 meter by 60 meter apron. No navigational aids nor night landing facilities are available on the airstrip.
The State run Maharashtra Airport Development Company (MADC) plans to extend the 1,250 meters airstrip by another 1,500 m and widen it by 150 m. 
Besides this nearest airports are Pune Airport, and Kolhapur Airport

Railways

 Karad – 4 km from city

Karad has railway station situated near ogalewadi about 04 km distance on the Karad Vita road from Karad Bus stand. Karad is onroute from Mumbai to Miraj, Sangli, Kolhapur, and Bangalore (some trains).
You can reach Karad from Mumbai or Pune easily by road or rail (Mahalaxmi Express, Koyna Express,"Goa Express", Sahyadri Express or Chalukya Express).

Railway Minister Suresh Prabhu has allocated funds for a plan to build a new 112 km railway line between Karad and Chiplun.

Nearest railway junction

 Miraj – 72 km
All super-fast trains like the Karnataka Sampark Kranti, Deekshaboomi Express, Rani Chenama Express, Haripriya Express and Miraj Hubli Express stop at Miraj Junction.  You can take private cars or MSRTC buses from Miraj to Karad. Travel time from Miraj to Karad is Approxroximately 1 hour 15 minutes.

.

 Railway Time Table Karad

Towards Miraj

Towards Pune

Economy

Karad has the Taswade MIDC in its vicinity which boasts many industries giving employment to people in the Satara District. Karad has the presence of Emerson Climate Technologies and Pidilite Industries Ltd. Karad is famous for its Jaggery and Cattle markets in entire Maharashtra. Jaggery of very high quality is manufactured and traded here. Such quality of jaggery is rarely available and is one of the best in the world. Chikki named after an Indian dessert is one of the special jaggery which is used as a key ingredient during the Indian festival of Makar Sankaranti. There is a big market yard where various commodities are traded and the geographical location of the city add to its benefit since it is known as the gateway to Konkan region from Western Maharashtra.
Karad is well known for sugar production and is known as the sugar bowl of Maharashtra owing to the presence of many sugar factories in and around Karad.

Education

High Schools

 Sadguru Gadage Maharaj (SGM) Prathamik Shala, Vidyanagar, Karad.
 Shri Shivaji Vidyalaya, Karad.
 Shri Shivaji Vidyalaya, Masur.
 Shri Shivaji Vidyalaya, Karve.
 Maharashtra High School, Karad.
 Holy Family Convent High School, Vidyanagar, Karad.
 Adarsh Primary School, Karad.
 Deshbhakta Bhikoba Approx.aji Salunkhe Vidyalaya, Kival.
 Venutai English Medium School, Karad.
 Keshavrao Pawar English Medium School, Karad.
 Yashwant High School, Karad.
 Vithamata High School, Karad.
 Tilak High School, Karad.
 Kanya Prashala, Karad.
 Anandrao Chavan high School, Karad.
 
 Sant Tukaram High School, Karad.
 
 Saraswati Vidya Mandir, Karad.
 Palkar Highschool, Karad.
 S.M.S English Medium School, Karad.
 KCT's Krishna English Medium, Malkapur, Karad.
 Husen Kasam Danekari Anglo Urdu High School, Karad.
 Shaheen Urdu Medium School, Karad (Primary).
 Shaheen Urdu Medium School, Karad.
 Star English School, Karad.
 Rotary School, Malkapur, Karad.
 Kalyani English Medium School, Karad.
 Podar International School, Karad.
 Bachpan English Medium School, Karad.
 Anandrao Chavan Vidyalaya, Malkapur, Karad.

Engineering Colleges

 Central Government's Earthquake Engineering Research Centre, Karad (Coming soon).
 Government College of Engineering, Karad.
 Dr. Daulatrao Aher College of Engineering, Karad.
 Shri Santkrupa College of Engineering, Ghogaoan, Karad.
 Dadasaheb Mokashi College of Engineering, Karad.

Architecture College
 Smt Premalatai Chavan College of Architecture, Karad.

Arts, Science, and Commerce Colleges

 Yashwantrao Chavan College of Science, Karad
 Venutai Chavan Art, Commerce college, Karad
 Sadguru Gadge Maharaj (SGM) Arts, Science, Commerce College, Karad 
 Anandrao Chavan Arts, Science, Commerce College, Karad
 Shikshan Maharashi Bapuji Salunkhe Arts, Science, Commerce College, Karad
 Mahila Maha Vidyalaya Arts, Science, Commerce College, Karad
 KCT's Jr. College of Science Malkapur, Karad.
 Vithamata Vidyalaya and Junior College, Karad

Polytechnic Colleges

 Government Polytechnic, Karad
 Premalatai Chavan Polytechnic, Karad
 Doulatrao Aher Polytechnic, Karad
 Dadasaheb Mokashi Polytechnic, Sadashivgad, Karad
 Shivajirao Desai Polytechnic, Daulatnagar, Patan, Karad
 Shri SanShri Santtkrupa Polytechnic, Ghogaoan, Karad
 Ramrao Nikam Polytechnic, Indoli, Karad
 Chatrapati Shahu Polytechnic, Atit

Other Colleges

 Government Pharmacy College, Karad
 Government Agriculture college, Karad
 Government ITI, Karad
 Krishna Institute of Medical Sciences, Karad

 Bharati Vidyapeeth Law College, Karad
 Yashavantrao Mohite Institute of Management, Karad
 Mahila College, Karad
 Late Advv. Dadasaheb Chavan College of Pharmacy, Masur Karad
 Vishwakarma-Dadasaheb Chavan Institute of Management & Research, Malwadi, Masur, Karad

 IIJT Institute, Karad
 Sunbeam Institute (CDAC's authorized Center )
 Shri Santkrupa Pharmacy College, Karad
 Dadasaheb Mokashi Food Managenant College, Karad

Aparna institute of nursing education, koyana vasahat, karad.

Culture

Performing arts
The city has a major hall for cultural activities and exhibitions: Yashwantrao Chavan Memorial - Town Hall. Cultural events of various organizations and gatherings of schools are also held here. The "Venutai Chavan Hall" is used for classical concerts, conducting national and international seminars on topics like science, space, traditions, culture, spirituality, etc.

Literature
Karad has a tradition of literature lovers. The prestigious 76th Akhil Bharatiya Marathi Sahitya Sammelan was held at banks of Krishna river in Karad in 2003.

Museums and historic areas
In the honor of his contribution to building modern Maharashtra a small visiting museum is created in the residence of Late Shri Yashwantrao Chavan in Karad. An ancient well, named Naktya Rawalyachi Vihir is located near Krishna river in Karad which shows the well planned construction techniques followed during the ancient times.

Yashwantrao Chavan Agricultural, Industrial and Cattle show
The late Yashwantrao Chavan Agricultural, Industrial and Cattle Show is mega regional Agricultural event of global standards held at Karad, by Krishi Uttpanna Bajar Samiti Karad since 2001. The event of around 500 exhibitors provides an excellent platform under one roof for showcasing the latest technology in agriculture, poultry and livestock, dairy, agro services and food processing and technology etc.

Sports

 Wrestling: India's first individual Olympics medal winner Khashaba Dadasaheb Jadhav is from village Goleshwar-Karad.
Wrestling:

2016 Nomad games world championship 
(Kyrgyzstan)
2017 Olympic Council of Asia
5th Indoor and martial art games
(Turkmenistan)
2018 Maharashtra kesari (jalana)
Participant
 Cricket: Shivaji Cricket Stadium is known for holding two Ranji Trophy matches.
 Badminton: Indoor Badminton Court facility is available at Shivaji Stadium and Social Club Karad.

Notable people

 Gopal Ganesh Agarkar (1856–1895), social reformer and newspaper editor born in Tembhu.
 Khashaba Jadhav (15 January 1926 – 14 August 1984) Born in a very poor farming family at Goleshwar Tal. Karad, the only individual Olympic Medal Winner for India until 2000. He won India's first individual Olympic medal by winning the Bronze medal on 23 July 1952, in the 1952 Helsinki Olympic Games for wrestling in bantamweight, which is the unbeaten record for India in wrestling until today. In 1993, Maharashtra State awarded him the Shiv Chhattrapati Award posthumously. In 2001, the Central Government also awarded him the Arjuna Award posthumously.
 Yashwantrao Chavan (12 March 1913 – 25 November 1984), an eminent Congress party politician, hailed from Karad. He was the first Chief Minister of Maharashtra and also served as the defence minister, finance minister, home minister, foreign affairs minister, and as the Deputy Prime Minister of India and became the first and only person from Maharashtra to hold this political post.
 P.D. Patil : One of the most important person in Karad city, he is responsible for the futuristic development of Karad at his time. He is a record holder for most terms served as mayor in Karad for 45 years. He also envisioned and laid out the plans for advance sewage system, which became a corner-stone in urban development in 1960's and 1970's. 
 Prithviraj Chavan: He was the 17th Chief Minister of Maharashtra. Chavan served as the Minister of State in the Prime Minister's Office in the Ministry of Parliamentary Affairs and Ministry of Personnel, Public Grievances, and Pensions. Chavan was also General Secretary of the All-India Congress Committee (AICC), in-charge of many states, including Jammu and Kashmir, Karnataka, Haryana, Gujarat, Tripura, and Arunachal Pradesh.

 Shrinivas Vinayak Kulkarni:

Noted Marathi Author. His books 'Doh', 'Sonyacha Pimpal', 'Panyache Pankh'and'Kordi Bhiksha' are considered milestones in Marathi literature. He has been awarded with Best literature awards by Govt of Maharashtra, Maharashtra Foundation (USA), Yashwantrao Chavan Karad Pratishthan etc.

 Prakash Narayan Sant: (:mr:प्रकाश नारायण संत) Noted Marathi author. His character 'Lampan' is a notorious but sensitive and smart child residing in Belgaum among his relatives and neighbours speaking Marathi language of Kannada flavour. His books include 'Vanvas', 'Sharadasangeet', 'Zumbar', 'Pankha', 'Chandanyacha Rasta'.
● Shriniwas Patil :-Shriniwas Patil (born 11 April 1941) is the Member of Lok Sabha from the Satara constituency in Maharashtra, India.[1] He is also the former Governor of Sikkim, India.[2] He was a member of the 13th and 14th Lok Sabha of India, from 1999 to 2009. He represented the Karad constituency of Maharashtra and is a member of the Nationalist Congress Party (NCP). He is a former Indian Administrative Service officer. He was elected as Member of Parliament for the third time by defeating former Member of Parliament Udayanraje Bhosale by over 87,000 votes in October 2019 Bypolls.

References

External links

 Slide Show Video About Karad 
 Facebook Page ( ???? ???? )
 Satara Goes Global
 Satara district website
 karaddiary

 
Cities and towns in Satara district
Talukas in Maharashtra